
Gmina Gizałki is a rural gmina (administrative district) in Pleszew County, Greater Poland Voivodeship, in west-central Poland.

Villages
Gmina Gizałki contains the villages and settlements of Białobłoty, Czołnochów, Dziewin Duży, Gizałki, Gizałki-Las, Leszczyca, Nowa Wieś, Obory, Obory-Kolonia, Orlina Duża, Orlina Mała, Ostrowska Kolonia, Ruda Wieczyńska, Studzianka, Świerczyna, Szymanowice, Tomice, Tomice-Las, Tomice-Młynik, Toporów, Wierzchy and Wronów.

Neighbouring gminas
Gmina Gizałki is bordered by the gminas of Chocz, Czermin, Grodziec, Pyzdry, Zagórów and Żerków.

References
Polish official population figures 2006

Gizalki
Pleszew County